Hasty Bank is a hill in the Cleveland Hills range of the North York Moors, in north-east England. The Cleveland Way National Trail crosses Hasty Bank and is part of Wainwright's Coast to Coast Walk. The north face of Hasty Bank has heavily eroded, possessing a vertical rocky face sloping steeply down to Broughton Bank. Roseberry Topping can be clearly seen from the summit which offers great views of the Tees Valley.

From the north, Hasty Bank is easily identified in line with Carlton Bank, Cringle Moor, Cold Moor, and Urra Moor which form the more northern facing hills of the range, before sweeping north to become the west facing hills up towards Roseberry Topping.

The Wainstones 
 
A large rocky outcrop known as the Wainstones lies at the western end of Hasty Bank, just below the summit. Exhibiting carvings including cup and ring markings, dating back to the Bronze Age, these rocks may once have held significant importance to prehistoric locals.

Gallery

References 

Mountains and hills of North Yorkshire
North York Moors